Ralph Robert "Nick" Farina (February 21, 1905 – September 1984) was a professional football player from Steelton, Pennsylvania. Farina attended and played college football for Villanova University from 1923 until 1926. He made his National Football League debut in 1927 with the Pottsville Maroons. He played for the Maroons for his entire career, lasting just one year.

1905 births
1984 deaths
People from Dauphin County, Pennsylvania
Players of American football from Pennsylvania
American football centers
Pottsville Maroons players
Villanova Wildcats football players